In mathematics, specifically in the theory of Markovian stochastic processes in probability theory, the Chapman–Kolmogorov equation(CKE) is an identity relating the joint probability distributions of different sets of coordinates on a stochastic process.   The equation was derived independently by both the British mathematician Sydney Chapman and the Russian mathematician Andrey Kolmogorov. CKE prominently used in recent Variational Bayesian methods.

Mathematical description 
Suppose that { fi } is an indexed collection of random variables, that is, a stochastic process. Let

be the joint probability density function of the values of the random variables f1 to fn. Then, the Chapman–Kolmogorov equation is

i.e. a straightforward marginalization over the nuisance variable.

(Note that nothing yet has been assumed about the temporal (or any other) ordering of the random variables—the above equation applies equally to the marginalization of any of them.)

Application to time-dilated Markov chains 

When the stochastic process under consideration is Markovian, the Chapman–Kolmogorov equation is equivalent to an identity on transition densities. In the Markov chain setting, one assumes that i1 < ... < in. Then, because of the Markov property,

where the conditional probability  is the transition probability between the times . So, the Chapman–Kolmogorov equation takes the form

Informally, this says that the probability of going from state 1 to state 3 can be found from the probabilities of going from 1 to an intermediate state 2 and then from 2 to 3, by adding up over all the possible intermediate states 2.

When the probability distribution on the state space of a Markov chain is discrete and the Markov chain is homogeneous, the Chapman–Kolmogorov equations can be expressed in terms of (possibly infinite-dimensional) matrix multiplication, thus:

where P(t) is the transition matrix of jump t, i.e., P(t) is the matrix such that entry (i,j) contains the probability of the chain moving from state i to state j in t steps.

As a corollary, it follows that to calculate the transition matrix of jump t, it is sufficient to raise the transition matrix of jump one to the power of t, that is

The differential form of the Chapman–Kolmogorov equation is known as master equation.

See also 

 Fokker–Planck equation (also known as Kolmogorov forward equation)
 Kolmogorov backward equation
 Examples of Markov chains

Further reading

External links 
 

Equations
Markov processes
Stochastic calculus